Positootly! is an album by pianist John Beasley. The album was Beasley's second for Resonance Records, and featured an eclectic combination of styles, including jazz, soul jazz, bossa nova, and nuevo tango. In 2010, Positootly! was nominated for the Grammy Award for Best Jazz Instrumental Album, Individual or Group.

Track listing
All compositions by John Beasley except as indicated

 "Caddo Bayou" – 5:04
 "Positootly!" – 4:32
 "Dindi" (Antônio Carlos Jobim) – 5:30
 "Black Thunder" – 6:41
 "Shatita Boom Boom (Club Desire)" – 4:58
 "Tanguedia III" (Astor Piazzolla) – 5:29
 "Elle" – 4:53
 "So Tired" (Bobby Timmons) – 4:45
 "The Eight Winds" – 4:51
 "Hope...Arkansas" – 2:32

Personnel
 John Beasley – keyboards
 Brian Lynch – trumpet
 Bennie Maupin – tenor and soprano saxophones
 James Genus – double bass, bass guitar
 Jeff "Tain" Watts – drums
 Munyungo Jackson – percussion

Production
George Klabin – Production
Joe Donofrio – Production

External links 
 BeasleyMusic.com
 'Positootly!' at Resonance Records

References

2009 albums